The 1991 Baltimore Orioles season  was a season in American baseball. It involved the Orioles finishing 6th in the American League East with a record of 67 wins and 95 losses. Cal Ripken. Jr. would be the first shortstop in the history of the American League to win two MVP awards in a career. This was also the Orioles' last year at Memorial Stadium, as they would move into Oriole Park at Camden Yards the following year.

Offseason
 October 10, 1990: Dorn Taylor was released by the Orioles.
 December 12, 1990: Todd Frohwirth was signed as a free agent by the Orioles.
 December 14, 1990: Mickey Weston was traded by the Orioles to the Toronto Blue Jays for Paul Kilgus.
 January 1, 1991: Roy Smith was signed as a free agent by the Orioles.
 January 10, 1991: Curt Schilling, Steve Finley and Pete Harnisch were traded by the Orioles to the Houston Astros for Glenn Davis.
 January 11, 1991: Mickey Tettleton was traded by the Orioles to the Detroit Tigers for Jeff Robinson.
 March 31, 1991: Pete Rose Jr. was traded by the Orioles to the Chicago White Sox for Joe Borowski.

Regular season
 April 13, 1991: Cal Ripken Jr. had 7 RBI in game versus the Texas Rangers.
 May 15, 1991: President George H.W. Bush attended a baseball game in Baltimore with Her Majesty, Queen Elizabeth II. The two saw the Oakland Athletics play the Baltimore Orioles for two innings.
 July 13, 1991, Bob Milacki, Mike Flanagan, Mark Williamson and Gregg Olson combined for a no-hitter versus the Oakland Athletics.
 Cal Ripken Jr. became the fourth shortstop in the history of Major League Baseball to have 30 home runs in one season and won the AL MVP award.
 Cal Ripken Jr. won the Gold Glove in 1991 after missing out in 1990 even though he set the single season record for both the fewest errors by a shortstop (3) and also the record for most total chances in a single season.

Opening Day starters
 Jeff Ballard
 Glenn Davis
 Mike Devereaux
 Dwight Evans
 Sam Horn
 Bob Melvin
 Randy Milligan
 Billy Ripken
 Cal Ripken Jr.
 Craig Worthington

Season standings

Record vs. opponents

Notable transactions
 April 2, 1991: Mike Flanagan was signed as a free agent by the Orioles.
 April 7, 1991: Ernie Whitt was signed as a free agent by the Orioles.
 June 3, 1991: Alex Ochoa was drafted by the Orioles in the 3rd round of the 1991 Major League Baseball draft. Player signed June 10, 1991.

Roster

Player stats

Batting

Starters by position
Note: Pos = Position; G = Games played; AB = At bats; H = Hits; Avg. = Batting average; HR = Home runs; RBI = Runs batted in

Other batters
Note: G = Games played; AB = At bats; H = Hits; Avg. = Batting average; HR = Home runs; RBI = Runs batted in

Pitching

Starting pitchers
Note: G = Games pitched; IP = Innings pitched; W = Wins; L = Losses; ERA = Earned run average; SO = Strikeouts

Other pitchers 
Note: G = Games pitched; IP = Innings pitched; W = Wins; L = Losses; ERA = Earned run average; SO = Strikeouts

Relief pitchers 
Note: G = Games pitched; W = Wins; L = Losses; SV = Saves; ERA = Earned run average; SO = Strikeouts

Awards and honors
 Cal Ripken Jr., American League Most Valuable Player
 Cal Ripken Jr., All-Star Game Most Valuable Player
 Cal Ripken Jr., Winner, All-Star Game Home Run Hitting Contest
 Cal Ripken Jr., Rawlings Gold Glove Award
 Joe Orsulak, Led American League, 22 Outfield Assists
All-Star Game
 Cal Ripken Jr., shortstop

Farm system

References

1991 Baltimore Orioles team at Baseball-Reference
1991 Baltimore Orioles season at baseball-almanac.com

Baltimore Orioles seasons
Baltimore Orioles season
Baltimore